This is a list of works by American jazz musician Dizzy Gillespie.

Discography

As leader 
1937–1949: The Complete RCA Victor Recordings compilation album (RCA Victor)
1945–1947: Groovin' High compilation album (Savoy)
1948: Gene Norman Presents Dizzy Gillespie in Concert (GNP Crescendo 23)
1950: Bird and Diz (Clef) – with Charlie Parker
1951–52: Dee Gee Days: The Savoy Sessions compilation album (Savoy) – includes all tracks on The Champ (Savoy) and School Days (Regent)
1952–53: The Great Blue Star Sessions 1952-1953 compilation album (EmArcy) – includes all tracks on Dizzy Gillespie and His Operatic Strings Orchestra (Fontana) and some tracks released on Dizzy at Home and Abroad (Atlantic)
1952: Horn of Plenty (Blue Note 1952)
1953: Dizzy Digs Paris (Giant Steps) – includes all tracks on Dizzy Over Paris (Roost)
1953: Jazz at Massey Hall (Debut) – with Charlie Parker, Bud Powell, Charles Mingus and Max Roach
1953: Diz and Getz (Norgran) – with Stan Getz
1954: Afro (Norgran)
1954: Dizzy and Strings (Norgran)
1954: Roy and Diz (Clef) – with Roy Eldridge
1954–1964: The Verve/Philips Dizzy Gillespie Small Group Sessions (Mosaic Records)
1954–55: Jazz Recital (Norgran) – also released as Dizzy Gillespie and His Orchestra
1955: One Night in Washington (Elektra Musician [1983])
1956: Modern Jazz Sextet (Norgran)
1956: World Statesman – Big Band (Norgran)
1956 and 1957: Dizzy in Greece – Big Band Studio Recordings (Verve)
1956: For Musicians Only (Verve) – with Stan Getz and Sonny Stitt
1957: Birks' Works – Big Band (Verve)
1957: Dizzy Gillespie and Stuff Smith (Verve)
1957: Sittin' In (Verve) – with Stan Getz and Coleman Hawkins
1957: Dizzy Gillespie at Newport – Big Band (Verve)
1957: Duets (Verve) – with Sonny Rollins and Sonny Stitt
1957: The Greatest Trumpet of Them All (Verve) – with Benny Golson
1957: Sonny Side Up (Verve) – with Sonny Rollins and Sonny Stitt
1959: The Ebullient Mr. Gillespie (Verve)
1959: Have Trumpet, Will Excite! (Verve)
1960: The Copenhagen Concert (SteepleChase) – with Leo Wright and Junior Mance
1960: A Portrait of Duke Ellington (Verve)
1960: Gillespiana (Verve) – composed and arranged by Lalo Schifrin
1961: An Electrifying Evening with the Dizzy Gillespie Quintet (Verve)
1961: Carnegie Hall Concert (Verve)
1961: Perceptions (Verve) – composed and arranged by J.J. Johnson, conducted by Gunther Schuller
1962: Dizzy on the French Riviera (Philips) – with Elek Bacsik
1962: The New Continent (Limelight) – composed and arranged by Lalo Schifrin
1963: New Wave (Philips) – 8 tracks
1963: New Wave! (Wing WL1152) – 7 tracks
1963: Something Old, Something New (Philips)
1963: Dizzy Gillespie and the Double Six of Paris (Philips)
1964: Dizzy Goes Hollywood (Philips)
1964: The Cool World (Philips)
1964: Jambo Caribe (Limelight)
1964: I/We Had a Ball (Limelight, 1965) – 1 track + 3 with Quincy Jones
1965: Gil Fuller & the Monterey Jazz Festival Orchestra featuring Dizzy Gillespie (Pacific Jazz) – with Gil Fuller
1966: The Melody Lingers On (Limelight)
1967: Swing Low, Sweet Cadillac (Impulse!)
1967: Live at the Village Vanguard (Solid State)
1968: The Dizzy Gillespie Reunion Big Band (MPS)
1969: It's My Way (Solid State) – also released as My Way
1969: Cornucopia (Solid State)
1970: The Real Thing (Perception) – with James Moody
1970: Portrait of Jenny (Perception)
1971: Giants (Perception) – with Bobby Hackett and Mary Lou Williams
1971: Dizzy Gillespie and the Mitchell Ruff Duo in Concert (Mainstream) – with Willie Ruff and Dwike Mitchell
1971: The Giants of Jazz (Atlantic) – with Art Blakey, Al McKibbon, Thelonious Monk, Sonny Stitt and Kai Winding
1973: The Giant (America)
1973: The Source (America)
1974: Dizzy Gillespie's Big 4 (Pablo)
1974: The Trumpet Kings Meet Joe Turner (Pablo) – with Joe Turner, Roy Eldridge, Harry "Sweets" Edison and Clark Terry
1974: Oscar Peterson and Dizzy Gillespie (Pablo) – with Oscar Peterson
1974: Oscar Peterson and The Trumpet Kings - Jousts (Pablo) – with Oscar Peterson
1975: The Bop Session (Sonet) – with Sonny Stitt, John Lewis, Hank Jones, Percy Heath and Max Roach
1975: Jazz Maturity...Where It's Coming From (Pablo) – with Oscar Peterson and Roy Eldridge
1975: Afro-Cuban Jazz Moods (Pablo) – with Machito
1975: The Dizzy Gillespie Big 7 (Pablo) – also released as Dizzy
1975: The Trumpet Kings at Montreux '75 (Pablo) – with Roy Eldridge, Clark Terry and Oscar Peterson
1975: Bahiana (Pablo)
1976: Carter, Gillespie Inc. (Pablo) – with Benny Carter
1976: Dizzy's Party (Pablo)
1977: Free Ride (Pablo) – composed and arranged by Lalo Schifrin
1977: The Gifted Ones (Pablo) – with Count Basie
1977: Dizzy Gillespie Jam (Pablo) – with Jon Faddis
1980: The Trumpet Summit Meets the Oscar Peterson Big 4 (Pablo) – with Freddie Hubbard, Clark Terry and Oscar Peterson
1980: The Alternate Blues (Pablo) – with Freddie Hubbard, Clark Terry and Oscar Peterson
1980: Digital at Montreux, 1980 (Pablo)
1981: Musician, Composer, Raconteur (Pablo)
1981: To a Finland Station (Pablo) – with Arturo Sandoval
1984: Closer to the Source (Atlantic)
1985: New Faces (GRP)
1986: Dizzy Gillespie Meets Phil Woods Quintet – with Phil Woods
1988: Endlessly (Impulse!)
1988: Oop-Pop-A-Da (Soundwings) – with Moe Koffman
1989: Live at the Royal Festival Hall (Enja) – with the United Nation Orchestra
1989: Max + Dizzy: Paris 1989 (A&M) – with Max Roach
1989: The Paris All Stars Homage to Charlie Parker (A&M) with Jackie McLean, Phil Woods, Stan Getz, Milt Jackson, Hank Jones, Percy Heath and Max Roach
1989: The Symphony Sessions (ProJazz) and 1991 as A Night in Tunisia (Fast Choice) (with Rochester Philharmonic conducted by Johnny Dankworth, Ron Holloway, Ed Cherry, John Lee)
1990: The Winter in Lisbon (Milan Entertainment) – soundtrack
1991: Live! at Blues Alley (with Ron Holloway, Ed Cherry, John Lee, Ignacio Berroa)
1992: Bird Songs: The Final Recordings (Telarc)
1992: To Bird with Love (Telarc)
1992: To Diz with Love (Telarc)

As sideman
With Benny Carter
 New Jazz Sounds (Norgran, 1954)
 In the Mood for Swing (MusicMasters, 1988)
With Arnett Cobb
 Show Time (Fantasy, 1987)
With Chaka Khan
 What Cha' Gonna Do for Me (Warner Bros., 1981)
With CTI All Stars
 Rhythmstick (CTI, 1990)
With Duke Ellington
 Jazz Party (Columbia, 1959)
With Coleman Hawkins
 Rainbow Mist (Delmark, 1944 [1992]) compilation of Apollo recordings
With Quincy Jones
 Back on the Block (Warner Bros., 1989)
With Aretha Franklin
 Who's Zoomin' Who? (Arista, 1985)
With Gene Krupa and Buddy Rich
 Krupa and Rich (Clef, 1955)
With Mike Longo
 Talk with the Spirits (Pablo, 1976)
With the Manhattan Transfer
 Vocalese (Atlantic, 1985)
With Chuck Mangione

 Tarantella (A&M Records, 1981)

With Carmen McRae
 November Girl (Black Lion, 1970 [1975]) with the Kenny Clarke/Francy Boland Big Band
 At the Great American Music Hall (Blue Note, 1976)
With Charles Mingus
 Charles Mingus and Friends in Concert (Columbia, 1972)
With Katie Bell Nubin
 Soul, Soul Searching (Verve, 1960)
With Oscar Peterson
 Oscar Peterson Jam - Montreux '77 (Pablo)
With Mongo Santamaria
 Montreux Heat! (Pablo, 1980)
 Summertime (Pablo, 1980)
With Woody Shaw
 Woody Shaw and Friends at Monterey Jazz Festival 1979 (Concord Jazz, 1979)
With Lillian Terry
 Oo-Shoo-Be-Doo-Be...Oo, Oo...Oo, Oo (Black Saint, 1985)
With Randy Weston
 Spirits of Our Ancestors (Verve, 1993)
With Louie Louie
 Sittin' in the Lap of Luxury (WTG/Epic, 1990)

Compositions 

"Anthropology" (AKA "Thriving from a Riff")
"Be-Bop"
"Birks' Works"
"Blue 'n' Boogie"
"The Champ"
"Con Alma"
"Dizzy Atmosphere"
"Emanon"
"Fiesta Mojo"
"Groovin' High"
"Guachi Guara" (AKA "Soul Sauce")
"Kush"
"Lorraine"
"Manteca"
"A Night in Tunisia" (AKA "Interlude")
"One Bass Hit"
"Ool Ya Koo"
"Oop Bop Sh'Bam"
"Ow!"
"Ray's Idea"
"Salt Peanuts"
"Shaw 'Nuff"
"Swing Low, Sweet Cadillac"
"That's Earl, Brother"
"Things to Come"
"Tin Tin Deo"
"Tour De Force"
"Two Bass Hit"
"Woody 'n' You" (AKA "Algo bueno")

Filmography 
 1946 Jivin' In Be-Bop 
 1983 Jazz in America (Embassy)
 1986 In Redondo Beach/Jazz in America (Embassy)
 1991 Dizzy Gillespie: A Night in Tunisia (VIEW)
 1993 Live in London (Kultur Video)
 1998 Dizzy Gillespie & Charles Mingus (Vidjazz)
 1998 Dizzy Gillespie: Ages (Vidjazz)
 1999 Jazz Casual: Dizzy Gillespie (Rhino)
 2001 Jivin'in Be-Bop (Jazz Classic Video)
 2001 Dizzy Gillespie: A Night in Chicago (VIEW)
 2001 Live at the Royal Festival Hall 1987 (Pioneer)
 2002 Live in Montreal (Image)
 2003 20th Century Jazz Masters
 2003 Swing Era (with Mel Tormé) (Idem)
 2005 Norman Granz Jazz in Montreux: Presents Dizzy Gillespie Sextet '77 (Eagle Vision USA)
 2005 Summer Jazz Live at New Jersey 1987 (FS World Jazz / Alpha Centauri Entertainment)
 2005 A Night in Havana: Dizzy Gillespie in Cuba (New Video Group) (Filmed in 1985 with Arturo Sandoval and Sayyd Abdul Al Khabyyr)
 2006 Jazz Icons: Live in '58 & '70 (Universal)
 2008 London Concerts 1965 & 1966 (Impro-Jazz Spain)

Bibliography 
 To Be or Not to Bop. New York: Doubleday, 1979.
 To Be or Not to Bop. Minneapolis: University of Minnesota Press, 2009.

References 

Discographies of American artists
Jazz discographies